The Dalradian Supergroup (informally and traditionally the Dalradian) is a stratigraphic unit (a sequence of rock strata) in the lithostratigraphy of the Grampian Highlands of Scotland and in the north and west of Ireland. The diverse assemblage of rocks which constitute the supergroup extend across Scotland from Islay in the west to Fraserburgh in the east and are confined by the Great Glen Fault to the northwest and the Highland Boundary Fault to the southeast. Much of Shetland east of the Walls Boundary Fault is also formed from Dalradian rocks. Dalradian rocks extend across the north of Ireland from County Antrim in the north east to Clifden on the Atlantic coast, although obscured by later Palaeogene lavas and tuffs or Carboniferous rocks in large sections.

Historical
The land to the southeast of the Great Glen was the old Celtic region of Dál Riata (Dalriada), and in 1891 Archibald Geikie proposed the name Dalradian as a convenient provisional designation for the complicated set of rocks to which it was then difficult to assign a definite position in the stratigraphical sequence.

In Archibald Geikie's words, "they consist in large proportion of altered sedimentary strata, now found in the form of mica-schist, graphite-schist, andalusite-schist, phyllite, schistose grit, greywacke and conglomerate, quartzite, limestone and other rocks, together with epidiorites, chlorite-schists, hornblende schists and other allied varieties, which probably mark sills, lava-sheets or beds of tuff, intercalated among the sediments. The total thickness of this assemblage of rocks must be many thousand feet." The Dalradian Series (as then defined) included the "Eastern or Younger schists" of eastern Sutherland, Ross-shire and Inverness-shire, the Moine gneiss, as well as the metamorphosed igneous and sedimentary rocks of the central, eastern and southwestern Scottish Highlands.

Age
The Dalradian is largely of Neoproterozoic (Sturtian to Vendian) age but likely extending into the Cambrian and possibly the Ordovician with the youngest rocks being at least 470 million years old. The oldest part of the sequence may be around 800 million years old.

Sub-units
The supergroup is composed of four groups which in stratigraphic order i.e. youngest at top, are:

Southern Highland Group
Argyll Group
Appin Group
Grampian Group

The upper three groups are applied to Ireland too; the Grampian Group is not recorded here nor in Shetland where the Dalradian is divided into a Clift Hills ‘Division’ which equates to the Southern Highland Group, a Whiteness ‘Division’ which equates to the Argyll Group and a Scatsta ‘Division’ which equates to the Appin Group. Though now metamorphosed, the Dalradian sequence was originally deposited as marine sands and muds, silt and limestone. Metamorphism has been low to medium grade for the most part and resulted in the formation of slates, phyllites, psammites, pelites and semipelites. The Tayvallich Subgroup contains volcanics within a turbidite basin and there are lavas within the overlying Southern Highland Group.

Southern Highland Group
The Southern Highland Group is found along the entire southeastern margin of the Grampian Highlands from Kintyre to Stonehaven and also in the northeast along the coastal strip between Fraserburgh and Portsoy, extending south to the Don valley. In Shetland, the Clift Hills Division extends from north of Lerwick south to Fitful Head. In Ireland the most extensive outcrop of the Southern Highland Group is to the north and south of Lough Foyle and west to Lough Swilly. Smaller exposures occur as far to the southwest as Inishbofin, County Galway.

Argyll and Appin groups

In mainland Scotland, the Appin and Argyll group sequences occupy the intermediate ground between the Southern Highland and Grampian groups. The Argyll Group is divided into four subgroups, thus:
Tayvallich Subgroup
Crinan Subgroup
Easdale Subgroup
Islay Subgroup
whilst the Appin Group is divided into three subgroups:
Blair Atholl Subgroup
Ballachulish Subgroup
Lochaber Subgroup
In Shetland the Whiteness ‘Division’ forms the core of  Mainland whilst the Scatsta ‘Division’ forms the western halves of Unst and Fetlar, all of Whalsay and much of the southeastern part of Mainland, east of the Nesting Fault. These rocks are also present in Ireland across County Londonderry and County Donegal and appear again in the Ox Mountains, the Nephin Beg Range and the Twelve Pins of Connemara.

Grampian Group
The Grampian Group rocks occupy the ground south west from Elgin and extending down the Great Glen as far as Corran on Loch Linnhe and, further east, as far south as Tyndrum. It is divided into three subgroups:
Glen Spean Subgroup
Corrieyairack Subgroup
Glenshirra Subgroup

Shetland sequence
The stratigraphic position of the sequence identified as Dalradian in the Shetland Islands is uncertain, because the main marker within the sequence in Scotland and Ireland, the Port Askaig Formation tillite, is not present. Carbon isotope data from four metamorphosed limestones within this mainly siliclastic sequence, suggest that the entire Shetland sequence probably lies stratigraphically above the tillite marker, explaining its absence.

Structure
The Grampian orogeny folded the sequence  in mainland Scotland into a series of major tight folds with NE-SW aligned fold axes. Much of the southeastern part of the outcrop forms a part of the Tay Nappe and involves the inversion of a large part of the succession. Caledonoid faulting on NE-SW lines affects the  sequence across the entire area.

References

External links

Metamorphic rocks
Geologic formations of the United Kingdom
Geology of Highland (council area)
Neoproterozoic
Geology of Ireland
Geological supergroups